Colombia competed at the 2011 Pan American Games in Guadalajara, Mexico from October 14 to 30, 2011. Colombia's team consisted of 284 athletes in 31 sports.

Medalists

Archery

Colombia has qualified a full men's and women's team of three athletes each.

Men

Women

Athletics

Men

Track and road events

Field events

Women

Track and road events

Field events

Basketball

Colombia has qualified a women's team.

Women

Team

Myriam Alonso
Elena Diaz
Elisa Garcia
Mabel Martinez
Ana Sofia Mendoza
Narlyn Mosquera
Jenifer Munoz
Sara Olarte
Maria Palacio
Katherine Quimbaya
Leidy Sanchez
Levys Torres

Standings

Results

Semifinals

Bronze medal Match

Beach volleyball

Colombia has qualified a women's team in the beach volleyball competition.

Bowling

Colombia has qualified two male and two female bowlers in the individual and team competitions.

Men

Individual

Pairs

Women
Individual

Pairs

Boxing

Colombia has qualified six athletes in the 49 kg, 52 kg, 56 kg, 60 kg, 75 kg, 91 kg and +91 kg men's categories; and two athletes in the 51 kg and 61 kg women's categories.

Men

Women

Canoeing

Men

Women

Cycling

Road Cycling

Men

Women

Track cycling

Sprints & Pursuit

Keirin

Omnium

Mountain Biking

Men

Women

Cycling BMX

Colombia has qualified Mariana Pajón Londoño (UCI World Champion 2011) and other Riders.

Diving

Men

Women

Equestrian

Dressage

Eventing

Individual jumping

Team jumping

Fencing

Colombia has qualified a men's team in the épée competition and one athlete each in the sabre competitions.

Men

Football

Colombia has qualified a women's team in the football competition.

Women

Squad

Lady Andrade
Carolina Arias
Katherine Arias
Katerin Castro
Julieth Dominguez
Angelica Hernandez
Fatima Montano
Daniela Montoya
Diana Ospina
Kelis Peduzini
Catalina Perez
Hazleydi Rincon
Carmen Rodallega
Kena Romero
Jessica Sánchez
Gavy Santos
Sandra Sepúlveda
Maria Usme

Standings

Results

Semifinals

Bronze medal Match

Gymnastics

Artistic
Colombia has qualified a full team of six male and six female athletes in the artistic gymnastics competition.

One of the artistic gymnasts is Yurany Avendaño who competed at the world championships artistic gymnastics 2010 in Rotterdam, The Netherlands. She is known as one of the better gymnasts in Colombia on the bars apparatus.

Men

Individual qualification & Team Finals

Individual Finals

Women
Individual qualification & Team Finals

Individual Finals

Rhythmic
Colombia has qualified one athlete in the individual rhythmic gymnastics competition.

All Around

Judo

Colombia has qualified five athletes in the 60 kg, 73 kg, 90 kg, 100 kg, and 100+kg men's categories and six athletes in the 48 kg, 52 kg, 57 kg, 63 kg, 70 kg, and 78 kg women's categories.

Men

Repechage Rounds

Women

Repechage Rounds

Karate

Colombia has qualified two athletes in the 60 kg, and 84 kg men's categories, and one athlete in the 50 kg women's categories.

Racquetball

Colombia has qualified four male and one female athletes in the racquetball competitions.

Men

Women

Roller skating

Colombia has qualified a men's and women's team in the roller skating competition.

Men

Artistic

Women

Artistic

Rowing

Men

Sailing

Colombia has qualified four boats and five athletes in the sailing competition.

Men

Open

Shooting

Men

Women

Squash

Colombia has qualified three male and three female athletes in the individual and team competitions.

Men

Women

Swimming

Men

Women

Synchronized swimming

Colombia has qualified a team and a duet in the synchronized swimming competition.

Table tennis

Colombia has qualified one male in the individual competition and three female athletes in the individual and team competitions.

Men

Women

Taekwondo

Colombia has qualified three athletes in the 58 kg, 80 kg, and 80+kg men's categories and four athletes in the 49 kg, 57 kg, 67 kg, and 67+kg women's categories.

Men

Women

Triathlon

Men

Women

Tennis

Men

Women

Mixed doubles

Water polo

Colombia has qualified a men's team.

Men

Team

Andres Aguilar
Jhon Andrade
Nelson Bejarano
Elkin Buitrago
Sergio Correa
Juan Felipe Echeverry
Juan Felipe Giraldo
Andres Hernandez
Ivan Idarraga
Jairo Lizarazo
Jorge Montoya
Enzo Salinas
Carlos Toro

Standings

Results

Elimination stage
Crossover

Seventh place match

Water skiing

Colombia has qualified a full team in the water skiing competition.

Men

Women

Weightlifting

Wrestling

Colombia has qualified four athletes in the 60 kg, 66 kg, 74 kg, and 96 kg men's freestyle categories, seven athletes in the 55 kg, 60 kg, 66 kg, 74 kg, 84 kg, 96 kg, and 120 kg men's Greco-Roman categories, and two athletes in the 48 kg and 63 kg women's freestyle categories.

Men
Freestyle

Greco-Roman

Women
Freestyle

References

Nations at the 2011 Pan American Games
Pan American Games
2011